Westlife Foodworld Limited (formerly Westlife Development Limited) is an Indian fast food restaurant holding company. Its wholly owned subsidiary Hardcastle Restaurants Pvt. Ltd. (HRPL) holds the master franchise for McDonald's in western India and South India.

McDonald's Indian subsidiary, McDonald's India Private Ltd., acquired complete ownership of Connaught Plaza Restaurants Limited, its other Indian master franchisee, on 9 May 2019, ending a partnership established in 1995 and leaving Westlife Development as McDonald's only third-party master franchisee in India.

History
Westlife Development was founded on 30 October 1982. Hardcastle Restaurants was established as a joint venture between Westlife Development and the McDonald's Corporation in 1995. Hardcastle opened its first McDonald's restaurant in Bandra, Mumbai in 1996, three days after McDonald's other Indian franchisee had opened the first McDonald's outlet in the country in Basant Lok, New Delhi. The joint venture was converted into a master franchisee in 2010. Amit Jatia, the Vice Chairman of Hardcastle Restaurants, acquired the McDonald's Corporation's 50% stake in Hardcastle for an undisclosed amount in late 2012. Hardcastle was merged into the listed group company Westlife Development, making the former a wholly owned subsidiary of the latter. Westlife Development was listed on the Bombay Stock Exchange on 27 August 2013.

McDonald's breakfast menu was launched in 2010, and made available all day long at select outlets from 2016. The first McCafe was opened in Mumbai in 2013.

In 2017, Hardcastle initiated a pilot project to use biodiesel made from used cooking oil to power its refrigerated supply delivery trucks some of its restaurants in Mumbai. The program was successfully rolled out to half of the company outlets by July 2018. Hardcastle began rolling out self-ordering kiosks at McDonald's outlets in 2017. The first kiosk was installed at the outlet in CR2 Mall at Nariman Point, Mumbai in March 2017.

References

External links

McDonald's India

Fast-food chains of India
 
Companies listed on the Bombay Stock Exchange
Companies based in Mumbai
Indian companies established in 1982
Companies listed on the National Stock Exchange of India